Bijela Crkva (literally, White Church) is a village in the municipality of Rožaje, Montenegro.

Demographics
According to the 2003 census, it had 195 inhabitants, who identified as a majority of Serbs (88%) and minority of Montenegrins (11%).

According to the 2011 census, its population was 183.

See also
Bela Crkva (disambiguation)

References

Populated places in Rožaje Municipality
Serb communities in Montenegro